Whitmore Lake is a census-designated place (CDP) and unincorporated community in the U.S. state of Michigan. The community spans the boundary between Green Oak Township in Livingston County and Northfield Township in Washtenaw County. The population of the CDP was 7,584 at the 2020 census.

It is situated around the shores of Whitmore Lake, and the CDP also includes the area around the smaller Horseshoe Lake to the south, Lawton Lake to the east and Monahan Lake to the northeast. U.S. Highway 23 forms the western edge of much of the CDP.

The Whitmore Lake post office, with ZIP code 48189, serves a larger area than that defined by the CDP and includes portions of southeast Hamburg Township, northeastern Webster Township, and larger parts of Green Oak and Northfield Townships than are included in the CDP.

The  Whitmore Lake was named by Jonathan F. Stratton, a surveyor, after Luke H. Whitmore, a local landowner around 1825. Area residents have considered incorporation many times, but have not chosen to do so yet.

The well-known Eight Mile Road that forms the boundary between the city of Detroit and Detroit's northern suburbs in Oakland and Macomb counties ends in Whitmore Lake, along with Five, Six, Seven and Nine Mile Roads.

Geography

Demographics

As of the census of 2000, there were 6,574 people, 2,663 households, and 1,741 families residing in the CDP. The racial makeup of the CDP was 96.05% White, 0.93% African American, 0.46% Native American, 0.47% Asian, 0.12% Pacific Islander, 0.23% from other races, and 1.75% from two or more races. Hispanic or Latino of any race were 1.46% of the population.

There were 2,663 households, out of which 32.7% had children under the age of 18 living with them, 51.7% were married couples living together, 9.4% had a female householder with no husband present, and 34.6% were non-families. 25.8% of all households were made up of individuals, and 4.1% had someone living alone who was 65 years of age or older.  The average household size was 2.42 and the average family size was 2.94.

In the CDP, 24.5% of the population was under the age of 18, 7.7% was from 18 to 24, 39.2% from 25 to 44, 20.9% from 45 to 64, and 7.7% were 65 years of age or older.  The median age was 34 years. For every 100 females, there were 102.6 males.  For every 100 females age 18 and over, there were 98.7 males.

The median income for a household in the CDP was $51,504, and the median income for a family was $63,113. Males had a median income of $42,174 versus $28,865 for females. The per capita income for the CDP was $26,066.  About 3.5% of families and 5.2% of the population were below the poverty line, including 5.8% of those under age 18 and 2.2% of those age 65 or over.

Arts and culture

Fourth of July celebration

Each year Whitmore Lake hosts a weekend-long celebration for Independence Day.  In 2011 it marked its 52nd year with the theme "Ignite the Spirit of America". Typical events include a fireworks display over the lake, a boat parade, a ski show performed by the Whitmore Lake Water Ski Club, a running / swimming race, and many other events.

Harvest Festival
The Whitmore Lake Harvest Festival is a two-day event that occurs annually at the end of September, and was first established in 2007.  The primary function of the 2009 Harvest Festival was to adopt a pet or donate money towards that cause.

Michigan Pond Hockey Classic
The Michigan Pond Hockey Classic is an annual adult pond hockey tournament held on Whitmore Lake.  Established in 2008, the event raises funds for families and schools to support youth participation in athletics.

Education
The community is served by Whitmore Lake Public Schools.  The Whitmore Lake High School Trojans are members of the Tri-County Conference.

Notable people
 Dave Alexander (musician), musician, member of the highly influential band The Stooges, born in Whitmore Lake

References

External links
Whitmore Lake Public Schools

Unincorporated communities in Livingston County, Michigan
Unincorporated communities in Washtenaw County, Michigan
Census-designated places in Michigan
Unincorporated communities in Michigan
Census-designated places in Washtenaw County, Michigan
Census-designated places in Livingston County, Michigan